Grażyna Szapołowska (born 19 September 1953) is a Polish film and theatre actress.

Life and career
She was born in Bydgoszcz. The father was of Latvian-Polish descent, and mother, Wanda, was Lithuanian-Polish descent. She has a sister, Lidia, who is 11 years older. After passing the baccalauréat she joined at Wroclaw Theatre of Pantomime. In 1977 she graduated from the National Academy of Dramatic Art in Warsaw. From 1977 until 1984 she was in the theatrical company of the National Theatre, Warsaw.

She starred in Károly Makk's 1982 Hungarian film Another Way which portrays a lesbian relationship, A Short Film About Love (1988) by Polish film director Krzysztof Kieślowski, and in its earlier and shorter form the sixth episode of Dekalog. It was she who suggested to Kieslowski the different ending of the full-length version. For that role she received the Polish Film Award at the 13th Gdynia Film Festival. She had previously starred in another Kieslowski film, Bez końca. She is also widely known for her portrayal of Telimena in Andrzej Wajda's 1999 film Pan Tadeusz, an adaptation of Adam Mickiewicz's epic poem of the same name.

In 2008 she was one of the contestants of the Polish version of Soapstar Superstar reality singing competition.

She also performed on stage as an interpreter of an actor's song. She sings in a soprano.

Filmography

1974 Najważniejszy dzień życia, episode Telefon (Telephone)
1977 Parada oszustów (Chet's Parade)
1978 Zapach ziemi (The Smell of Earth)
1978 Osiemdziesięciu huzarów (80 Hussars)
1981 Wielka majówka (The Big Picnic)
1982 Wielki Szu (Big Shar)
1982 Egymásra nézve (Another Way)
1983 Lata dwudzieste... lata trzydzieste... (The Twenties, the Thirties )
1983 Nadzór (Custody)
1984 Bez końca (No End)
1984 Szirmok, virágok, koszorúk (The Flowers of Reverie)
1984 Przyspieszenie (To accelerate)
1985 Medium
1985 By Touch (Przez dotyk)
1986 Magnat (The Magnate)
1986 Biała wizytówka (White visiting-card)
1987 Tabu (Taboo)
1987 Zagon
1987 Первая встреча, последняя встреча (СССР)
1988 Hanussen
1988 Krótki film o miłości (A Short Film About Love)
1989 A Tale of Adam Mickiewicz's 'Forefathers' Eve'
1991 Żegnaj, cudzoziemko (Goodbye foreigner)
1991 Lebewohl, Fremde
1991 The Conviction
1992 Piękna nieznajoma (A Beautiful Stranger)
1993 Piazza di Spagna (The Spanish Square)
1997 Kroniki domowe
1997 
1999 Pan Tadeusz (Pan Tadeusz: The Last Foray in Lithuania)
2004 Nachbarinnen  (Wanted!)
2005 Ewa paliła Camele
2005 Karol: A Man Who Became Pope
2006 Just Love Me
2006 Magda M.
2007 Ryś
2007 Jutro idziemy do kina
2008 Nie kłam kochanie
2011 
2013 Run Boy Run as Ewa Staniak
2017 Nie kłam kochanie

See also
Polish cinema
Polish Film Awards

References

1953 births
Living people
Actors from Bydgoszcz
20th-century Polish actresses
21st-century Polish actresses
Polish film actresses
Aleksander Zelwerowicz National Academy of Dramatic Art in Warsaw alumni
Polish stage actresses
Recipients of the Gold Medal for Merit to Culture – Gloria Artis
People from Toruń
Polish people of Latvian descent
Polish people of Lithuanian descent